Ivana Lie Ing Hoa (born March 7, 1960) is an Indonesian former badminton player who played at the world level from the late 1970s to the late 1980s.

Early life 
She was born in Bandung, Indonesia on 7 March 1960. She came from a poor family; her mother was a dressmaker. She became interested in Badminton during her childhood; she won a Junior Championship in West Java in 1975.

Career 
In the 1980 IBF World Championships in Jakarta she earned a silver medal in women's singles, losing the final to fellow countrywoman Verawaty Wiharjo, after defeating defending champion Lene Køppen in the semifinal. She won singles at the Taiwan Open in 1982, the Indonesia Open and the Southeast Asian Games in 1983, and at the Chinese Taipei Masters Invitation in 1984. She was runner-up at the 1984 World Badminton Grand Prix to China's formidable Han Aiping. Though primarily a singles player early in her career, she eventually achieved success in the other games; winning mixed doubles at the quadrennial Asian Games (1982), the Badminton World Cup (1983), and the Indonesia (1983, 1984) and U.S. (1988) Opens, all with Christian Hadinata; and winning the Indonesia Open twice (1986, 1987), the first China Open (1986), and reaching the final of the World Badminton Grand Prix (1986) in women's doubles . She played on four Indonesian Uber Cup (women's international) squads, three of which (1978, 1981, and 1986) finished second in this world team competition. Attractive and popular, she became a badminton commentator after her playing career was over.

Achievements

World Championships

World Cup

Asian Games

Southeast Asian Games

International tournaments 
The World Badminton Grand Prix has been sanctioned by the International Badminton Federation from 1983 to 2006.

Invitational tournaments

References 

1960 births
Living people
Sportspeople from Bandung
Indonesian people of Chinese descent
Indonesian Hokkien people
Indonesian female badminton players
Badminton players at the 1978 Asian Games
Badminton players at the 1982 Asian Games
Badminton players at the 1986 Asian Games
Asian Games gold medalists for Indonesia
Asian Games silver medalists for Indonesia
Asian Games bronze medalists for Indonesia
Asian Games medalists in badminton
Medalists at the 1978 Asian Games
Medalists at the 1982 Asian Games
Medalists at the 1986 Asian Games
Competitors at the 1979 Southeast Asian Games
Competitors at the 1981 Southeast Asian Games
Competitors at the 1983 Southeast Asian Games
Competitors at the 1985 Southeast Asian Games
Southeast Asian Games gold medalists for Indonesia
Southeast Asian Games silver medalists for Indonesia
Southeast Asian Games medalists in badminton